The following is an incomplete list of sports stadiums in East Asia. They are ordered by their capacity, that is the maximum number of spectators the stadium can normally accommodate, therefore excluding temporary extra accommodations.

Capacity of 50,000 or more

References

East Asia by capacity
Stadiums by capacity
East Asia stadiums by capacity